Mamadou Barry (born 19 December 1991 in Faranah) is a Guinean middle-distance runner.  He competed in the 1500 metres competition at the 2012 Summer Olympics.

References

1991 births
Living people
Guinean male middle-distance runners
Olympic athletes of Guinea
Athletes (track and field) at the 2012 Summer Olympics
World Athletics Championships athletes for Guinea
Olympic male middle-distance runners